Belmont Cragin is one of 77 officially designated Chicago community areas located on the Northwest Side of the City of Chicago, Illinois. It is designated Community Area 19, and is located  NW of the Loop.

History

Beginnings
The first business to open in Belmont Cragin was a saloon opened by George Merrill sometime after 1835, when he settled with his family at the intersection of Armitage and Grand Avenues. Operating the saloon out of his home, Merrill catered to truck farmers carrying produce over the plank road to the city. The corner, named Whiskey Point, prompted many colorful and romanticized legends but attracted few permanent residents.

In 1862, Michael Moran established a hotel at Whiskey Point, but the area remained rural until 20 years later, when Cragin Brothers & Company moved their tin plate and sheet iron processing plant near Whiskey Point. The plant and warehouses covered , and the Chicago, Milwaukee & St. Paul Railroad built a station at Leclaire Avenue to accommodate all the employees. The station closed in 2006, replaced by the Grand-Cicero station on Metra’s Milwaukee District/West Line. Cragin also purchased a rivet company and moved machinery and workers from Connecticut to the location. Job opportunities and rail service brought settlers and a housing boom to the town, now named Cragin. Within two years, Cragin's population was 200, and the community boasted a general store, two schoolhouses, and a Congregational church. The area rests on prairie and a ridge that was formed by a glacier. It was settled by farmers before the population took off from residents leaving Chicago for better living conditions and new factories in the area. Belmont-Cragin was eventually annexed by the City of Chicago.

Industrialization and development
Railroads drew more factories and workers to the area, which was annexed into Chicago as part of Jefferson Township in 1889. The Belt Railway Company extended its service into the area in 1883, and plants developed in the new neighborhoods of Hanson Park and Galewood. In the same year, the Washburn and Moen Manufacturing Company launched a branch for its wire products, and the Western Brick and Tile Company found Galewood's superior clay soil conducive to business. By 1891, Westinghouse, Church, Kerr & Company Iron Works, the Pitts Agricultural Works Warehouse, and the Rice and Bullen Malting Company brought more people into Cragin.

In 1922 W. F. Hall Printing Company erected a plant on  adjacent to the Northwestern railroad line, which further spurred manufacturing development. Swedish, German, and Irish workers were among the earliest to move near these factories. By 1920, these jobs drew Poles and Italians as well, and the population of the area more than quadrupled in the next decade. By 1930 the population escalated to 60,221, one-third foreign-born. In the 1930s, the community area became known as Belmont Cragin. Other companies came to the area too including Zenith (TV and electronics), and Ecco (cooking ware). Builders inundated the area to fill the housing needs of area workers. Bungalows, Cape Cods, and two-flats offered a range of housing type choices. Especially popular was the subdivided residential neighborhood on the eastern border named Belmont Park.

1940s through the present day
During the postwar years, until the 1990s, mostly descendants of Europeans, mostly already assimilated second, third and fourth generation German, Greek, Irish, Italian, Polish, and Scandinavians had populated the area. The area was heavily dominated by both Catholic and Lutheran churches and schools.

In the 1920s a retail shopping district began to develop along Belmont Avenue, known as Belmont Central. It eventually drew in retailers that once included Goldblatt's Department Store, Woolworth's, Walgreens, Ben Franklin, SS Kresge's — later becoming K-mart in the Brickyard mall, JC Penney — also moving to the Brickyard Mall, IHOP restaurant, and Will Rodgers movie theatre. Children's playgrounds were built. Present-day Riis Park began life as a golf course, and later became a park designed by Jan Jenssen, famed national park designer.  The Chicago Transit Authority in the 1940s extended its Belmont Street electric bus service beyond Central, transporting new patrons into the shopping district. Gas buses arrived in the 1970s. A 1981 addition of a nearby parking garage continued to contribute to business prosperity but the area had seen its days since the opening of the Brickyard Mall. In March 1977, the opening of the Brickyard Shopping Mall on the former site of the Carey Brickyard property at Narragansett and Diversey added new vitality to the community, drawing city and suburban shoppers away from Belmont Central shopping district, Six Corners, suburbs and downtown. The original Brickyard Mall was an enclosed three-level building but was demolished in 2003 to pave way for big box stores including Target and Lowe's, along with the strip mall making it more automobile friendly rather than pedestrian friendly. Jewel Osco was originally in the location of Target in the old mall floor plan that once included Montgomery Ward and JC Penney department stores and K-mart.

Until the early 1980s, Central Soya and its silos were located south of Grand Ave on Laramie; In 1943, Revere Copper opened a war materiel plant where Grand Ave. meets Fullerton Ave. From 1953 to 1963, Western Electric assembled mobile radar units in this structure and erected a tall concrete test stand at the corner of Fullerton and Normandy. Glidden paint was located just south of the train station on the 1800 block of North LeClaire Ave until the early 1980s. Cragin Department Store, located on the 4900 block of West Armitage, was a family-owned clothing and shoe store until the 1980s. Hawthorn Melody Dairy was located at Grand and Laramie. Reda's Liquors and Lizzi's House of Pizza were also located in the area. Dominick's grocery store was located on Central Ave. at Altgeld St. before the company was sold off and closed down. Tony's grocery store now anchors this location.

Belmont Cragin's overall population grew by more than 6 percent in the 1980s and 37 percent in the 1990s. The Hispanic population grew from 3,072 in 1980 to 16,846 in 1990. By the 2000 census the area was 65 percent Hispanic, joining the Polish immigrants and businesses who had come to the area earlier. A number of young middle-class professionals joined blue-collar laborers in the area. Residents formed an active coalition called the Northwest Neighborhood Federation to address increases in crime, gangs, and school overpopulation.

By 1995, Hall Printing and other plants had closed their doors. The area experienced a drop in manufacturing employment and a decline in retail activity during the 1980s. Concerns over unemployment and an increasing poverty level have led residents to organize a home reinvestment campaign and to study ways of reviving the commercial climate in the area.

Education
Chicago Public Schools operates district public schools.

Elementary and middle schools serving Belmont Cragin include Barry, Falconer, Locke, Lyon, Camras,  Schubert, Burbank, Prieto, Hanson Park, Lloyd, and Northwest Middle.

The Catholic Archdiocese of Chicago operates many parish churches, grade schools and St. Patrick's high school within the district. 
Notre Dame High School for girls - Mango & Wrightwood
Steinmetz High School and Foreman High School serve sections of Belmont Cragin.

The Chicago Public Library Portage-Cragin Branch serves Belmont Cragin. It first opened in a storefront in 1927, with a permanent library opening on November 1, 1969.
The West Belmont Branch Chicago Public Library serves the western division of Belmont Central at 3104 N. Narragansett Ave.

Politics
The Belmont Cragin community has supported the Democratic Party in the past two presidential elections by large margins. In the 2016 presidential election, Belmont Cragin cast 15,403 votes for Hillary Clinton and cast 2,376 votes for Donald Trump (83.90% to 12.94%). In the 2012 presidential election, Belmont Cragin cast
12,398 votes for Barack Obama and cast 2,079 votes for Mitt Romney (84.75% to 14.21%).

References

External links
 Official City of Chicago Belmont Cragin Community Map
 Riis Park

Community areas of Chicago
North Side, Chicago
Populated places established in 1835